Kinnitty Cross is a high cross and National Monument located near Kinnitty, County Offaly, Ireland.

Location

Kinnitty Cross is in the grounds of Castle Bernard, built on the west bank of the River Camcor, about 1.5 km (1 mile) east of Kinnitty village.

History

Saint Finnian of Clonard (470–549) built a monastery on the site, and the high cross is associated with this monastery.

Local legend claims that the cross was erected by a St. Colman to commemorate the conversion of his father, Óengus mac Nad Froích (430–489), by Saint Patrick. The cross was covered with carvings in the 9th century by Máel Sechnaill mac Máele Ruanaid (d. 862), High King of Ireland.

Description

References

National Monuments in County Offaly
High crosses in the Republic of Ireland